Lex Luthor is a fictional character and supervillain in The CW's Arrowverse, first introduced in the 2017 episode "Luthors", of the Supergirl, based on character of the same name, created by Jerry Siegel and Joe Shuster, and was adapted for television in 2017 by Glen Winter and Greg Berlanti. The character of Lex Luthor is the nemesis of Superman.
In the Arrowverse, Lex Luthor is an independent businessman, who runs LuthorCorp. At some point he met Superman and became friends. Their friendship ended when Superman wouldn't adopt Lex's violent and chaotic thinking. Lex became obsessed with Superman. This path eventually led him to prison. Afterwards, he sees Supergirl as a threat. Lex stops his plan to kill her cousin and focuses on her.

Concept and creation 
Lex Luthor is one of the most recognizable and prominent supervillain characters in DC Comics. He made his debut in Action Comics #23, in 1940, created by Jerry Siegel and Joe Shuster. According to IGN, he comes fourth, in a list of one hundred supervillains, across media. The character had previously been portrayed in live-action TV at other times, including in Superboy, Lois & Clark: The New Adventures of Superman and Smallville, by Scott James Wells and Sherman Howard in the first, John Shea in the second and by Michael Rosenbaum in the third mentioned show. The character has also appeared in movies, like Atom Man vs. Superman, Superman, Superman II, Superman IV, Superman Returns, Batman v Superman: Dawn of Justice and Justice League, portrayed by Lyle Talbot, Gene Hackman, Kevin Spacey and Jesse Eisenberg.

With the announcement of a Supergirl  TV show, speculation arose as to whether Lex would appear. The character made an appearance in the episode, "Luthors" of Supergirl's season 2, in 2017, portrayed by Aidan Fink as a young Lex Luthor. Eventually, Cryer appeared in season 4 as an adult Lex, in a recurring capacity, as the "big bad" of the season. He would later return for season 5 and season 6, again as a recurring character and the primary villain of these episodes. He, also, played a crucial role in the Arrowverse crossover event, titled Crisis on Infinite Earths in 2019.

Characterization 
Cryer was cast as Lex Luthor in 2017, and was the only choice by producers Robert Rovner and Jessica Queller, who admitted of being "enormous" fans of his. When asked about his portrayal, he responded by saying that it is a "lovely" experience, and that he wanted to do justice for the character in show. Queller also stated that "I don’t think we could have possibly done better in our casting, and I mean, we’re just thrilled". According to Cryer, he believes that Lex Luthor is a sociopath, with only one link to reality, that being his sister, Lena Luthor. He also highlighted his intelligence and focus on science, while stating that his narcissism is a problem for everyone else. When asked how it is to play a villain, Cryer said "[I'm] still getting my sea legs." and that it is a hard character.

Cryer also pointed out that Lex has a manipulative behavior towards others in the series, viewing others as chess pieces, and as inferior to him. About his character's development in season 6, in which he falls in love with another character of the show, Nyxlygsptlnz, said that he was scared about removing his "dark side", something that brought up to producer Queller, saying that "Why? Why would Lex fall in love? He is Lex Luthor.". Cryer revealed that he enjoy playing the character, to the point he called the head of Warner Bros. Television Studios, Peter Roth, and asked him to play a part in Crisis on Infinite Earths, with the studio not having plans to use him, describing the event as "humiliating" for him. For the role, Cryer admitted to having read DC comic books to prepare, even though he describes himself as a "geek", already having vast knowledge of the character. Cryer was a strong advocate of Lex eventually defeating Supergirl, something that he pitched numerous times to the producers of the show.

Fictional character biography

Early life 

Lex Luthor was born sometime after 1984 in Metropolis, to billionaires Lionel and Lillian Luthor. Since early childhood, Lex exhibited an extremely high intellect. As a child he shown anti-social behaviour. In 1997, the illegitimate daughter of Lionel and half-sister of Lex, Lena, was adopted by the Luthors, something that angered Lex. Eventually, the two of them became close friends. During his teenage years, he shown signs of psychopathy. As his father distanced himself, Lex developed a hatred for Lionel. After Lionel's death, he inherited the family company, Luthor Corp. At some point he met Superman and the two of them worked together on stopping alien invasions, but Lex's techniques were too brutal. Superman and Lex had a falling out, and he started believing that Superman was the reason for the invasions. His obsession with Superman caused the fracture within his relationship with Lena.

Scheme to kill Supergirl 

After several years and various brutal encounters resulting in numerous fatalities, Lex and Superman had a final confrontation in early 2016, prior to which Lex turned Earth's yellow sun, red in an attempt to de-power the Kryptonian, consequently causing destruction on a global scale. The police found him, but he escaped, only to later be captured by Superman. Lex went to trial but killed the judge and all the people inside the chamber. He was later incarcerated for thirty-one consecutive life terms and sent to Stryker's Island Penitentiary. Inside the prison, he hired the assassin John Corben to kill his sister, after she took over Luthor Corp (later changing the name to L-Corp). His plan failed after Superman and Supergirl intervened. While in prison, Lex spent the next few years planning his escape.

In 2018, the Kaznian's Minister of Defence informed Lex about the existence of a copy of Supergirl. Lex travelled with the Minister to Kaznia, to meet her, and begin her training. After months of training, he took her to National City, to give her an idea of how Supergirl lives. At some point, the Supergirl duplicate develops a sickness. In order to save her, Lex enters a radioactive chamber, causing him to develop cancer. Freed from prison on a mercy furlough, Lex was transported to his mansion. He arranges for his assassin and love interest, Eve Teschmacher, to shoot James Olsen, to distract Lena. As Lena goes to the hospital, Lex cuts the electricity, forcing her to inject James with an experimental vaccine to save his life. Lex gambled that, if it worked, it would also save Lex from cancer. After Lena realizes that he was behind the black-out, she goes to confront him, only to discover he was cured by the vaccine and developed superhuman powers. He flees, and battles Supergirl. A few hours later he arrived in Kaznia and gives the copy a blood transfusion in order to restore her health, calling her "Red Daughter". He directs her to kill Supergirl's mother, Eliza Danvers, to "kill" her heart. The Red Daughter goes to Eliza's house and forces her to call Kara. Supergirl arrives and the two fought, with the duplicate losing. During this, Lex arrives at the White House and meets with President Baker, reminding him of everything Lex had done for his political career. Lex receives a phone call from a Kaznian General, with Lex arranging for Kaznia to attack the United States. As the attack was happens, Lex dons a "Lexosuit", and Red Daughter attacks the Kaznian troops, annihilating them. Red Daughter tells him that she killed Supergirl. Lex shoots the Supergirl duplicate, seemingly killing her. Afterwards, he transports her to a special cell, designed to extract energy from her and convert it into a power source. Later, Lex began supplying energy to the houses that had been damaged by the Kaznian bombings, with the President announcing his upcoming appointment as Secretary of the United States Department of Alien Affairs. With Supergirl being dead, and having the President on his hand, Lex's plan to overtake American succeeds.

His ambitions didn't stop there, as he invades the planet and home of Superman, Argo City. A team led by Supergirl stop his attack. Lex arrives on Shelley Island, the location of Supergirls' team, wearing his Lexosuit, in order to kill them. Here, he battles Supergirl. He lost the battle, whith his Lexosuit being destroyed. He goes to the cabin where he and Lena spent their vacations. There, Lena extracts the serum from his body, resulting in his death.

Joining the Crisis 

With the beginning of the Anti-Monitor invasion of the Multiverse, the Monitor brought Lex back from the dead, to assist the heroes, and in return Lex asked him to for Lena to maintain her Pre-Crisis memories. The Monitor brought him to the Waverider, and Lex met a furious Kara Danvers and Kate Kane / Batwoman. After that, he found the Book of Destiny, and leaves the ship to kill as many versions of Superman as he can. He first visited Earth-75, and killed that universe's Superman. He then travels to Earth-167, with the same intentions, but learns that that Clark Kent gave up his powers. Afterwards, Lex goes to Earth-96, and  uses the Book of Destiny to brainwash Clark Kent / Superman to fight the Superman from Lex's universe. The two Supermen fight, but Lois Lane of Lex's universe knocked Lex out, ending his control. Lex was locked in the Waverider, until he is able to get the Book again, using it to save himself from the anti-matter wave that destroyed the Waverider, and the whole Multiverse, placing his name as the Paragon of Truth, transporting himself to the Vanishing Point.

In the Vanishing Point, he tried to open a portal to reality with a machine, with the help of Ryan Choi, but failed. Then, Barry Allen / The Flash returned from the Speed Force, unable to find a way out of the Point. Afterwards, Oliver Queen / Spectre appeared and helped Barry unlock his full potential, sending Lex, Kara and Ryan to the past, to the planet Maltus, 10,000 years before Monitor created the Anti-Monitor. There, Lex tries to backstab his team, and fails to get the Monitor to side with Lex. The team is transported to the Dawn of Time to fight the Anti-Monitor. Lex and the other Paragons fought the Anti-Monitor's army, with Oliver sacrificing himself to recreate the Multiverse.

In the new Multiverse, Lex's Earth merged with Earth-1 and Jefferson Pierce / Black Lightning's Earth, resulting in Lex being seen by the public as a good guy, something that Supergirl doubts. In the new reality he is the owner of LexCorp and leader of the Department of Extranormal Operations (now a subsidiary of his company), and became a Nobel Peace Prize winner.

Manipulating Brainiac 5 and Obsidian Tech 

At some point, he met with his mother, Lillian, now the head of the Luthor Foundation, and started scheming about destroying the Fortress of Solitude. To win Lena over, Lex used a truth-inducing organism on his arm, to prove his honesty. At a "Man of Tomorrow" event held by the Luthor family, reporter William Dey privately talked to Kara voicing his suspicion that the Luthors did away with Russell Rogers when they bought out his company. Brainiac 5 later visited Lex, concerned about Leviathan as he shows him a picture of a possible doppelganger that resembles Winn Schott. Lex Luthor visits Gamemnae / Gemma Cooper, and persuades her to arrange a collaboration between LuthorCorp and Obsidian Tech. After Brainiac 5 becomes the new Director of the D.E.O. following Alex Danvers's resignation, he gives Lex the information he needs from the alternate Winn Schott / Toyman's A.I. hacking. Lex then tracks down Gemma and offers a partnership between LuthorCorp and Obsidian Tech. From day one of Earth-Prime, Lex had manipulated Eve Teschmacher into being his inside person in Leviathan where he tricks her into killing Jeremiah Danvers. While Kara Danvers / Supergirl is preventing a Sun-Eater from eating the Sun, Lex goes to the scene of where those who were trapped in virtual reality were being held and frees them, killing Margot Morrison. Gemma confronts Lex about his actions, and he states that she should focus her anger towards their mutual enemy, Supergirl. Later that night, Lex revealed to Eve that the people he had protecting her mother will dispose of her should she go against him. He also has the footage of Eve killing Jeremiah. When Eve states that he is worse than Leviathan, Lex disagrees. After a talk with his mother, Lex uses Lena's transportation watch to go to the Fortress of Solitude. Lex visited Lena at Stryker's Island, noting that her project would fail causing Lena to see that Kara was right about Lex. After getting a call from Gemma that Rama Khan succeeded in his mission to obtain the Kryptonite from the D.E.O., Lex informs Brainy that they now have access to Leviathan's ship. When he enters the ship, Lex is given a special pin by Gemma to keep him safe from the ship's defenses. The two of them begin their plot involving the Unity Festival. After Brainiac 5 enters the code that leads to the bottling of Rama Khan, Tezumak, and Sela, Gemma briefly shuts down causing Lex to go after Brainiac 5. He finds a weakened Brainiac 5 on Leviathan's ship and claims the bottle containing Rama Khan, Tezumak, and Sela. After getting away, he gives the bottle to Lillian to begin their next plot.

Final plan against Supergirl 

Lex goes ahead with his next phase of his plan by having Lillian copying the powers of the Leviathan members into him, while her also warning him of the outcome. During the fight at the Fortress of Solitude with Supergirl, Lex was managed to use the Phantom Zone Projector to send Supergirl into the Phantom Zone. He was arrested and sent to trial. While incarcerated at National City Prison, Lex was visited by Lillian who stated that she told him so. Lena then arrives and uses the brainwashing machine, Myriad, to erase their memories of Supergirl's identity from their minds. In the trial, Lena testified against him, revealing that he used brainwashing technology to appeal to the jury. The verdict was that he was innocent, something that shocked him, as he didn't expect that. After that, Lex and Lena fought for the control of LuthorCorp. Lex sent his bodyguard, Otis Graves, sabotage the new children's wing at the hospital and noting that killing him won't change anything, Lena told Lex that she is leaving LuthorCorp.

He later visited the future where he befriended and fell in love with a future Nyxlygsptlnz "Nyxly". Together they mixed science with magic. However, Nyxly made a fatal mistake with the Totems, that killed her. Lex preserved the mind of Nyxly in A.I. form and placed it in a Lexosuit that he sent to the present Nyxly, to stop her death. However, present Nyxly didn't want anything to do with him. Lex reunited with Otis, and suggested that if Nyxly loved him before, Lex should try again. Lex quickly devised a plan to get the Love Totem to her. However, Nyxly wasn't happy with the assistance and the Superfriends got the totem. Lex saved Nyxly from being imprisoned, revealing their future romance and that he was trying to save her. After the Nyxly A.I. helped Nyxly obtain the Dream Totem, Lex appeared to her and assisted in obtaining the remaining Totems, that have infinity power. Supergirl and her team managed to get the other pieces of the Totems. In the final battle between him and Nyxly against the Superfriends, they created brought back as magic constructs enemies like Kara Danvers / Overgirl, Red Tornado, Metallo and dragons. After they were defeated, he opens a portal to the Phantom Zone allowing Phantoms to attack them. The Phantoms instead drag Lex and Nyxly into the Phantom Zone, as Supergirl and her allies had rallied the people of National City to have courage while Lex and Nyxly were giving off hubris which the Phantoms are also attracted to.

Appearances

Arrowverse
 The character first appeared in the episode "Luthors" of Supergirl season 2, portrayed by Aidan Fink as a young Lex Luthor, in 2017.
 Jon Cryer made his first appearance as Lex Luthor in the episode "O Brother, Where Art Thou?" of season 4, in 2019.
 He then appeared in the crossover event, Crisis on Infinite Earths, and the shows Batwoman, The Flash, Arrow and Legends of Tomorrow, in 2019 and 2020.

Alternate versions

Superman & Lois
An alternate version was mentioned in two episodes of Superman & Lois in 2021. The John Henry Irons of an alternate Earth stole an exosuit from his reality's Lex Luthor which he used in the fight against his world's Superman and Tal-Rho. The A.I. Hedy originally referred to John as "Captain Luthor". Superman and Lois of their Earth thought that he was a relative of Lex Luthor until the fingerprints on the box he had proved otherwise.

This version of Lex Luthor will appear in season 3, portrayed by Michael Cudlitz.

Reception 
Cryer was cast to portray Lex Luthor on November 16, 2018, on the CW show Supergirl in a recurring role. Many fans started to pointing comparisons and differences between his version, and Jesse Eisenberg's version, with many suggesting that he is at the right age, he is better at manipulation and he tends on being more comic accurate, an important factor set by the fans, while on the other hand claiming that he lacks clear direction. The book Adapting Superman: Essays on the Transmedia Man of Steel includes the chapter "Forging Kryptonite: Lex Luthor's Xenophobia as Societal Fracturing, from Batman v Superman to Supergirl," which analyzes both versions as part of "a representation exploring the cultural effects of encroaching xenophobia" from society to the family in the years around the 2016 United States presidential election. Comparisons also began with Michael Rosenbaum's version, this time citing that his dynamic with Superman is never shown and he is not as relatable as expected. On an interview with the website CBR.com, Jon Cryer claimed that the ending of Supergirl's season 6 was intentionally left open for a potential return of his character in another Arrowverse or another DC show in the future, because of the overwhelming support from the fans. IGN supported the idea that his version was the definitive one and his performance hijacked Crisis on Infinite Earths and Supergirl's season 5.

Accolades

In other media 

The character appears in the Crisis on Infinite Earths tie-in comic book one-shot, titled "Crisis on Infinite Earths Giant #1". During the later one, Lex joins other universes Lexes, and together form the Council of Luthors, with the common of killing all Supermen, and defeat the Council of Supermen. His Council fails.

See also 
 Lex Luthor in other media
 Lex Luthor (Smallville)
 Lex Luthor (DC Extended Universe)
 Lex Luthor (1978 film series character)
 List of Superman supporting characters

Notes

References 

Arrowverse characters
DC Comics characters
Television characters introduced in 2017
DC Comics male supervillains
DC Comics scientists
Fictional businesspeople
Fictional mass murderers
Fictional inventors
Television supervillains
Fictional mad scientists
Fictional scientists in television